Recourse debt is a debt that is backed by  collateral from the borrower. Also known as a recourse loan, this type of debt allows the lender to collect from the debtor and the debtor's assets in the case of default as opposed to foreclosing on a particular property or asset as with a home loan or auto loan. Nonpayment of recourse debt allows the lender the right to collect assets or pursue legal action. While mortgages in the US are typically nonrecourse debt, a foreclosure or bankruptcy can trigger the loan to become recourse debt at the request of the lending institution.

Classification
Recourse debt can either be full or limited recourse debt. A full recourse debt gives the granter the right to take any and all assets of the debtor, up to the full amount of the debts. The lender will sell the seized assets, including the asset acquired through the original loan. Limited, or partial recourse debt, relies on the original loan contract, where named assets are the extent to which a lender may take action.

See also
Nonrecourse debt
Mortgage loan
Collateral (finance)
Security deposit

References

Debt